This is a list of the individuals who were, at any given time, considered the next in line to inherit the throne of Russia or Grand Prince of Moscow. Those who actually succeeded (at any future time) are shown in bold. Stillborn children and infants surviving less than a month are not included.

1281 to 1547
At this time the ruler is known as Grand Prince of Moscow.

1547 to 1722
From this point of the ruler is Tsar (Czar) of Russia.

1722 to 1797
Between Peter I's decree on the succession to the throne of 16 February 1722 and Paul I's decree of 15 May 1797, the Emperor had the right to name his or her own successor.  All heirs in this period were nominated by the reigning monarch, rather than holding the position by right of inheritance.  Despite Peter the Great's modification of the law to allow nomination of a successor by the monarch, neither he nor his two immediate successors ever nominated an heir, and Catherine I, Peter II, and Anna were all chosen irregularly, after the death of their predecessor.  In addition, Ivan VI, who had not named a successor, was deposed in a coup, while Peter III, who was deposed and murdered after a coup, was succeeded not by his son Paul, his chosen successor, but by his wife, who became Catherine II.

1797 to 1917

In 1797, Emperor Paul modified the laws of succession, abolishing the Petrine law and establishing in its place a law establishing semi-Salic succession among his own descendants.  This law remained until the abolition of the monarchy.

Although Grand Duke Constantine Pavlovich renounced his claims to the throne in 1822, he did so secretly, and so was still widely viewed as heir to the throne until his older brother's death in 1825.  At the death of Alexander I, the next brother, who would become Nicholas I, deferred his claims until his older brother Constantine renounced once again, but after Constantine's second renunciation he claimed to have taken the throne immediately upon Alexander's death.

See also
 Tsesarevich

References

Russia history-related lists
Russian throne
Russia
Russian monarchy